Eucalyptus deflexa, commonly known as Lake King mallee, is a species of mallee that is endemic to Western Australia. It has smooth grey to whitish bark, linear to elliptic or curved adult leaves, pendulous flower buds arranged in groups of seven, cream-coloured or pink flowers and pendulous barrel-shaped fruit.

Description
Flowering occurs from March to November and the flowers are creamy white or pink.

Taxonomy and naming
The specific epithet (deflexa) refers to the deflexed flowers.

Distribution and habitat
Lake King mallee grows in shrubland on flats or slight rises to the north and north-east of Lake King in the Coolgardie and Mallee biogeographic regions.

Conservation status
This eucalypt is classified as "Priority Four" by the Government of Western Australia Department of Parks and Wildlife, meaning that is rare or near threatened.

See also

List of Eucalyptus species

References

Eucalypts of Western Australia
Trees of Australia
deflexa
Myrtales of Australia
Plants described in 1976
Taxa named by Ian Brooker